A list of films produced in Italy in 1989 (see 1989 in film):

Footnotes

Sources

External links
 Italian films of 1989 at the Internet Movie Database

1989
Italian
Films